The 2014–15 TCU Horned Frogs women's basketball team represented Texas Christian University in the 2014–15 NCAA Division I women's basketball season. The 2014–15 season was head coach Raegan Pebley's first season at TCU. They played their home games at the Student Recreation Center in Fort Worth, Texas due to renovation at Daniel–Meyer Coliseum and are members of the Big 12 Conference.  The Horned Frogs finished the season with an 18–14 record overall and a 9–9 record in conference play.  Following regular season play, the team received an invitation to the 2015 Women's National Invitation Tournament advancing to second round play after defeating the Stephen F. Austin Ladyjacks.  The Horned Frogs's season ended with an overtime loss to the Southern Miss Lady Eagles in the second round of the tournament.

Roster

Schedule and results 

|-
!colspan=9 style="background:#342A7B; color:#FFFFFF;"| Exhibition

|-
!colspan=9 style="background:#342A7B; color:#FFFFFF;"| Non-Conference Games

|-
!colspan=9 style="background:#342A7B; color:#FFFFFF;"| Conference Games

|-
!colspan=9 style="background:#342A7B; color:#FFFFFF;"|  2015 Big 12 women's basketball tournament

|-
!colspan=9 style="background:#342A7B; color:#FFFFFF;"| Women's National Invitation Tournament (WNIT)

See also 
 2014–15 TCU Horned Frogs men's basketball team

References 

TCU
TCU Horned Frogs women's basketball seasons